The people listed below were all born in, residents of, or otherwise closely associated with the city of Kingston, New York.

Notable people

Actors, musicians and others in the entertainment industry
 Margarethe Bence (1930–1992), opera singer
 Peter Bogdanovich (1939-2022), film director, writer and actor; born in Kingston
 Larry Cohen (1941–2019), film producer, director, and screenwriter; born in Kingston
 Robert Craft (1923–2015), conductor and writer who worked with and had a lifelong friendship with composer Igor Stravinsky, recording a number of his works; born in the city
 Luann de Lesseps, former countess and current star of Real Housewives of New York City, purchased a home along the Hudson River in 2018. It has been featured on the television show.
 Josh Eppard (b. 1979), drummer for progressive rock band Coheed and Cambria; born in Kingston
 John Glover (b. 1944), actor, born in Kingston
 Tom Hart (b. 1969), comics creator, born in Kingston
 Robert Hutton (1920–1994), film actor; born and died in Kingston
 Paul Austin Kelly (b. 1960), opera tenor, jazz singer, children's music performer and impresario
 Joseph Kesselring (1902–1967), writer and playwright best known for his play Arsenic and Old Lace, died in Kingston
 Paul Kreppel (b. 1947), television and Broadway theatre director and actor; born in Kingston
 Pauline Oliveros composer, performer, humanitarian, pioneer in American music
 Henry Paul (b. 1949), southern rock and country singer/songwriter; born in Kingston
 Anne Sweeney (b. 1957), Co-Chair of Disney Media and President of the Disney–ABC Television Group; been named the "Most Powerful Woman in Entertainment" by The Hollywood Reporter, one of the "50 Most Powerful Women in Business" by Fortune magazine, and one of "The World's 100 Most Powerful Women" by Forbes; spent her childhood in Kingston and is a graduate of Coleman High School

Politics, political activism, government service

 George Clinton (1739–1812), fourth vice president of the United States and first elected governor of New York State, is buried in the city at the Old Dutch Church
 Charles DeWitt (1727–1789), miller and statesman from Kingston, served as a delegate to the Continental Congress
 Arthur Sherwood Flemming (1905–1996), United States Secretary of Health and Human Services
 Abraham B. Hasbrouck (1791–1879), U.S. Congressman and the sixth President of Rutgers College (now Rutgers University), born and died in Kingston
 Robert W. Hasbrouck, U.S. Army major general
 Alton B. Parker (1852–1926), Democratic presidential nominee in 1904, practiced law in the city and was the first president of the Ulster County Bar Association. Also president of Ulster County Savings Institution for eight years. He not only lost the election, he didn't even carry Ulster County.
 Henry Granville Sharpe (1858–1947), 24th Quartermaster General
 Nicholas Sickles (1801–1845), US Congressman
 John Van Buren (1799–1855), US Congressman
 Daniel Tompkins Van Buren, son of John Van Buren, American Civil War veteran who attained the rank of brigadier general by brevet in the Union Army
  Josh Green Governor of Hawaii, Former Lieutenant Governor

Others

 Joe Ausanio (b. 1965), pitcher for the New York Yankees during the 1990s; born and grew up in Kingston; half-brother of Major Leaguer Paul Runge
 Bud Culloton (1896-1976), pitcher for the Pittsburgh Pirates
 Heywood Hale Broun (1918–2001), sportswriter and commentator, died in the city, had family in nearby Woodstock
 Gerald Celente (b. 1946), publisher of Trends Journal
 Billy Costello (1956-2011), former WBC junior welterweight champion
 Robert H. Dietz (1921–1945), United States Army soldier and Medal of Honor recipient in World War II. Kingston's Dietz Stadium (football and soccer) is named for him
 Mike Ferraro (b. 1944), third baseman for the New York Yankees and Milwaukee Brewers; later coach for the Kansas City Royals; born in Kingston
 Ezra Fitch (1866–1930), the "Fitch" in Abercrombie & Fitch, practiced law in Kingston before leaving to join Abercrombie in his wilderness outfitting store in New York City in 1900; bought out Abercrombie in 1907
 Tom Hallion (b. 1956), Major League Baseball umpire
 Charles Lang Freer (1854–1919), donated his art collection to the Smithsonian Institution; born in Kingston; namesake of the Freer Gallery of Art, part of the Smithsonian
 Walter B. Gibson (1897–1985), author and professional magician, known for his pulp-fiction character The Shadow
 Brian Kenny (b. 1963), journalist; anchor of  Friday Night Fights and ESPNEWS' The Hot List; previously worked for WTZA in the city
 Edgar F. Luckenbach (1868–1943), shipping magnate, Luckenbach Steamship Company
 James Mahoney (1925–2002), auxiliary bishop of the Archdiocese of New York
 Jervis McEntee (1828–1891), painter of the Hudson River School; buried in Montrepose Cemetery in the city
 Evaline Ness (1911–1986), illustrator and author; won a Caldecott Medal in 1967 for Sam, Bangs, and Moonshine; was married to "Untouchable" Eliot Ness, 1938–1946; died in the city
 Maud Petersham (1890–1971), won the Caldecott Medal with her husband and co-author Miska Petrezselyem Mikaly in 1946 for The Rooster Crows;  born in Kingston
 Andrée Ruellan (1905–2006), painter whose works are in the permanent collections of the Metropolitan Museum of Art and the Whitney Museum; died in the city
 Paul Runge Jr., (b. 1958), infielder for the Atlanta Braves during the 1980s; manager of several minor league teams; born and grew up in Kingston; half-brother of major leaguer Joe Ausanio
 Clarence W. Spangenberger (1905–2008), businessman and former president of Cornell Steamboat Company
 Ron Suskind (b. 1959), journalist and writer
 John Vanderlyn (1776–1852), neoclassicist painter; born in Kingston
 Calvert Vaux (1824–1895), architect and landscape designer; co-designer of Central Park, NYC; buried in Kingston's Montrepose Cemetery
 Kate Youngman (1841–1910), Christian missionary to Japan, established the Ihaien leprosy hospital in Tokyo, Japan

Notes

 
 
Kingston
Kingston, New York